The 1937 Ice Hockey World Championships were held between February 17 and February 27, 1937, in London, England. Eleven teams took part in this World Championship. Teams from Austria and Czechoslovakia were supposed to be in attendance as well but had issues travelling, and cancelled.

In the preliminary round, the teams were divided into three groups: two groups of four teams and a group with three teams. The top three teams in the groups with four teams and the top two in the group with three teams advanced to the second round. The second round consisted of two groups of four with the top two teams in each group advancing to the final round. The other four teams in the second round played in the consolation round for places 5-8. The three teams that did not advance to the second round were supposed to play off for places 9-11, but first Romania, then both Sweden and Norway decided not to continue playing.

Canada won its ninth world championship title while the host, Great Britain, won its third European championship. The British team, using many of the players from the previous year's Olympics, won their first seven games by a combined total of forty-five to zero, before losing to Canada. The Swiss team finished third, with their final round losses to Canada and Great Britain both coming in overtime.

First round

Group A 

Standings

Group B 

Standings

Group C 

Standings

Second round

Group A 

Standings

Group B 

Standings

Consolation Round -- 5th to 8th place 

Standings

Poland forfeited their games against Hungary and France, which are officially viewed as five to nothing losses.

Final Round – 1st to 4th place 

Standings

Final Rankings – World Championships

Teams

Final Rankings – European Championships  

European Champions 1937

Citations

References
Complete results

External links

IIHF Men's World Ice Hockey Championships
International ice hockey competitions hosted by the United Kingdom
Ice Hockey World Championships
International sports competitions in London
Ice Hockey World Championships
1936–37 in British ice hockey